Lulu Wang (born 22 December 1960) is a Chinese-born writer who has lived in the Netherlands since 1986. She is a best-selling novelist and also a columnist for Shijie Bolan (World Vision).

Early life 
Lulu Wang was born on 22 December 1960 in Beijing, China. Her mother was a teacher of literature. At Peking University, Wang studied subjects including English language and literature. After graduation, she taught at the university before moving to the Netherlands in 1986, at the age of 26; there she taught Chinese at the Zuyd University of Applied Sciences in Maastricht.

Writing career 
In 1997, she published her semi-autobiographical debut novel, Het Lelietheater ("The Lily Theatre"), which is strewn with Chinese-language proverbs and rhymes translated into Dutch. The novel sold over 800,000 copies in the Netherlands and earned her the Gouden Ezelsoor in 1998 for the bestselling literary debut work; the following year, it won an International Nonino Prize at the Salzburg Easter Festival. In 1997, she was noted to be the best-selling Dutch-language author. The novel has been translated from Dutch into several languages, including English.

Her 2010 novel, Wilde rozen is, like her debut, a book based on her life in China; this time, the main character is twelve-year-old Qiangwei, who grows up during the Cultural Revolution. Wang called it her most personal book yet. In 2012, she published Nederland, wo ai ni, a book app containing animations, music, and a discussion forum, also available as an e-book; it was later published in a printed version as well. A second book app was published in 2013, Zomervolliefde, a bilingual Dutch and Chinese publication including poems, illustrations, a song, and a short movie.

In addition to being a best-selling author, Wang works as a columnist for the international Chinese-language magazines World Vision (Chinese: 世界博览, pinyin: Shìjiè Bólǎn) and World Affairs (Chinese: 世界知识, pinyin: Shìjiè Zhīshì).

Awards
 Gouden Ezelsoor (1998)
 International Nonino Prize (1999) at the Salzburg Easter Festival

Selected works
(1997) Het lelietheater (The Lily Theater)
(1998) Brief aan mijn lezers (Letter To My Readers)
(1999) Het tedere kind (The Tender Child)
(2001) Het Witte Feest (The White Party)
(2001) Seringendroom (Lilac Dream)
(2002) Het Rode Feest (The Red Party)
(2004) Bedwelmd (Intoxicated)
(2007) Heldere Maan (Bright Moon)
(2010) Wilde rozen (Wild Roses)
(2010) Lotusvingers (Lotus Fingers)
(2012) Nederland, wo ai ni (Netherlands, Wo Ai Ni)
(2013) Zomervolliefde (Summer Full Love)
(2014) Adam en Eva in China (Adam and Eva in China)
(2015) Levenlangverliefd （Life Long in Love /情燃毕生）

References

Bibliography

External links 

 
 Lulu Wang at the Digital Library for Dutch Literature

1960 births
20th-century Dutch novelists
21st-century Dutch novelists
Chinese emigrants to the Netherlands
Chinese women novelists
Dutch women novelists
Living people
Peking University alumni
Academic staff of Peking University
Writers from Beijing
20th-century Dutch women writers
21st-century Dutch women writers